19 Vulpeculae is star located approximately 1,690 light years from Earth in the northern constellation of Vulpecula. It is a probable member of the open cluster NGC 6882. This object is visible to the naked eye as a faint, orange-hued star with an apparent visual magnitude of 5.40. It is moving closer to the Earth with a heliocentric radial velocity of −19 km/s.

This is an aging giant star with a stellar classification of K2 IIIa, having already consumed the hydrogen at its core and evolved away from the main sequence. It has nearly five times the mass of the Sun but has expanded to around 100 times the Sun's radius. The star is radiating 2,889 times the Sun's luminosity from its enlarged photosphere at an effective temperature of 4,200 K.

References

External links
 

K-type giants
Vulpecula
Durchmusterung objects
Vulpeculae, 19
192004
099518
7718